Jimmie Rodgers (born James Charles Rodgers, September 8, 1897 – May 26, 1933) was an American singer-songwriter and musician who rose to popularity in the late 1920s. Widely regarded as "the Father of Country Music", he is best known for his distinctive rhythmic yodeling. Rodgers was known as "The Singing Brakeman" and "America's Blue Yodeler". He has been cited as an inspiration by many artists, and he was inducted into multiple hall of fame. 

Originally from Meridian, Mississippi, Rodgers was the son of a railroad worker. During his early childhood, the family moved according to the needs of his father's employment, or Rodgers' own poor health.  As a teenager, he was musically influenced by the diverse vaudeville shows that he often attended. At the age of 13, Rodgers won a local singing contest, and then he travelled through the Southern United States with a medicine show. After his father took him back home to Meridian, Rodgers dropped out of school and he joined the Mobile and Ohio Railroad. He started as a waterboy, and he eventually became a brakeman, among performing other functions. During his time working with different railroad companies, the singer further developed his music style, as he was influenced by the gandy dancers and their blues impromptu performances. Rodgers was diagnosed with tuberculosis in 1924. By 1927, he stopped working for the railroad, as his health affected him and he decided to focus on his music career. 

Rodgers joined the Tenneva Ramblers band in 1927 working at a radio station. After the band was fired from their spot, they worked in different resorts on the Blue Ridge Mountains. There, Rodgers became aware of the field recordings that Victor Talking Machine Company's engineer Ralph Peer was to undertake in Bristol, Tennessee. During what later became known as the Bristol sessions, Rodgers recorded solo as he was deserted by his band after a disagreement. A second session with Rodgers was later arranged in Camden, New Jersey, at the singer's own insistence, that produced "Blue Yodel No. 1 (T for Texas)". The song became a success and it propelled Rodgers to national fame, while it assured him a recording career that produced over 100 songs for the label.

Early life 
The Rodgers family migrated to the United States from Ireland before the American revolution. They settled around the Appalachian Mountains, and later moved to the south and western United States. Both of Jimmie Rodgers' grandfathers served in the Confederate States Army during the American Civil War. After the war, his maternal grandfather settled in  Meridian, Mississippi, while his paternal grandfather settled around Geiger, Alabama. Rodgers' father, Aaron, worked for the Mobile and Ohio Railroad. He eventually became a foreman, and in 1884, he married Eliza Bozeman. The couple lived on the railroad work camps, as Aaron Rodgers moved through different locations around the line. The Rodgers family then temporarily settled in the community of Pine Springs, north of Meridian.  

Charles James "Jimmie" Rodgers was born on September 8, 1897. His place of birth is disputed: Meridian, Mississippi is most often listed in records, while Rodgers would later sign a document that  named Geiger, Alabama. Rodgers often called Meridian his home town. Uncapable of living in the unsanitary conditions of the camps, Rodgers' mother decided to stay in Pine Springs while her husband worked long stays and returned home. After two miscarriages, her health began to fail. She became sick and Aaron Rodgers quit his job at the Mobile and Ohio Railroad and started to farm to be closer to his wife. She died in 1903. Then six year old Jimmie Rodgers was deeply affected by her death.  Rodgers was sent along with his brother Talmage to live with relatives of his father in Scooba, Mississippi, and later to Geiger, Alabama.  Rodgers attended school irregularly during his early childhood. He left it after the death of his mother and he soon later started over the first grade in Pine Springs. The following year, after the family moved to Lowndes County, Mississippi he and his brother went to school in the town of Artesia. The road conditions, as well as both brothers engaging in other distractions along the way ultimately led to them arrive late, or not to attend. Rodgers often missed classes during the winter on account of his tendence to suffer of respiratory issues. His father remarried, and the family moved to Meridian, where Rodgers was enrolled at the local high school. He and his siblings had issues with their new step-mother. When his father returned to work for the railroad, Rodgers rarely went to school.  He and his brother Jake went to the local theaters to see vaudeville shows and to watch movies, while they joined other teenagers in mischief  around the town. As a result, Rodgers became interested in the entertainment industry. To support his expenditures, he sold newspapers, molasses and he panhandled.  In 1906, he was sent to live with his older brother Talmage and their aunt Dora Bozeman in Pine Springs, while his brother Jake was sent to other relatives. The routine of the Bozeman household grounded Rodgers with chores, while he spent most of his free time outdoors.  He attended school regularly, and he was further assisted by his teacher, who rented a room at his aunt's boarding house.  Rodgers received most of his schooling while he lived there until he went back to Meridian in 1911.  

Upon his return to Meridian, he went back to the streets. He frequented the barbershop of his uncle Tom Bozeman, while he often slept during the daytime in the upstairs apartment. He organized a neighborhood carnival that played the nearby towns. Rodgers' appearances made enough money to pay for the sheets he used as a tent. He then organized a second show, which he financed with his father's money, unbeknownst to him. Rodgers then won a contest at the local Elite Theater for his performance of the songs "Steamboat Bill" and "I Wonder Why Bill Bailey Don't Come Home". Following his success on the contest, Rodgers started to perform with a medicine show. He quit the show some weeks later as they reached Birmingham, Alabama for his constant issues with the director. At the age of thirteen, he started working for a tailor in West Blocton until his father took him back to Meridian months later with the intention of enrolling him at a new school. Soon after, his step-mother died. Instead of attending school, he followed his father to learn his profession with the working crews of the Mobile and Ohio Railroad. 

Rodgers started working for the railroad as a waterboy for the black  gandy dancer crews, who introduced him to jargon and blues music. Eventually, he became a baggage handler and then a brakeman. He moved often while working on the lines from Mississippi to Texas. In January 1917, he was introduced by a friend to Stella Kelly in Durant, Mississippi. At the time he was moving between Jackson and New Orleans without a stable location. He maintained the lines, checked baggage and at times he worked as a dishwasher at a local restaurant in Durant. He and Kelly married on April 6, 1917. The newlyweds left Durant after Rodgers failed a mechanic apprenticeship and moved to Louisville, Mississippi, where he worked once again as a brakeman. After his marriage failed, Rodgers started working for the New Orleans and Northeastern Railroad. He spent time in both, Meridian and New Orleans. At the end of the First World War when the United States Railroad Administration was privatized, Rodgers was fired in 1920 and he returned to work at odd jobs. He returned to work stints in the early 1920s on the lines he already had worked plus the Vicksburg, Shreveport and Pacific Railway mainly as a brakeman, but he also performed other functions including flagman.

Music career
In 1924, Rodgers was diagnosed with tuberculosis at the age of 27. The disease affected his ability to perform his job and he chose to move with his wife and children to Arizona, following the medical advice of the time that suggested high and dry places to ease the symptoms. Then Rodgers moved to Asheville, North Carolina. As he worked less on the railroads, he returned to performing music while his foremen complained of his extended absences. He formed a jazz-style band that performed pop standards with the inclusion of horns, and the piano accompaniment of his new wife Carrie McWilliams' sister, Elsie. The group played on the road in tents, on city streets, and in various other small locations without any commercial success. In 1927 Rodgers left his work on the railroad. He met in Asheville the Grant Brothers, who led the mountain music string band the Tenneva Ramblers. Rodgers convinced the group to join him as the Jimmie Rodgers Entertainers with him as the lead singer for a recurrent unpaid spot he managed to obtain at WWNC. The band was composed of Rodgers (vocals and guitar), Claude Grant (vocals and guitar), Jack Grant (mandolin), Jack Pierce (fiddle), and at times Claude Sagle (banjo). 

After the group was fired from the radio show, they found a job performing at a resort on the Blue Ridge Mountains. There, Rodgers heard of the upcoming field recordings that engineer Ralph Peer of the Victor Talking Machine Company was to undertake in Bristol, Tennessee in the search of local talent. Rodgers made an appointment for the band to record with Peer on August 4, 1927. Before the scheduled recording, the band had a dispute with the singer regarding the name to be used on the label of the recording. The Tenneva Ramblers then deserted Rodgers, who convinced Peer to record him alone with his guitar. Peer later commented that he considered Rodgers and individualist that due to his blues-leanient style was uncompatible with the sound of the Tenneva Ramblers band, which based its music around the use of fiddles. Peer felt by the end of Rodgers' session that though he liked the singer, he could not sign him to the label as he performed at the time pop music that belonged to New York publishers instead of the original tunes Peer was scouting for.  The session produced "The Soldier's Sweetheart", an adaptation of an old vaudeville tune with new lyrics by Rodgers, and a version of the showtune "Sleep, Baby, Sleep". The producer then told Rodgers that he would contact him at a later point  to hear new original material. Rodgers then moved with his family to Washington, D.C. while the record was selling some copies. After a month of not hearing back from Peer, Rodgers decided to travel to New York City, where he checked into the Manger Hotel and called the producer to let him know that he was ready to undertake the next recording session.  Impressed by Rodgers' boldness, Peer set an appointment for November 30, 1927 on Studio 1 of the Victor Talking Machine Company in Camden, New Jersey. The first few numbers that Rodgers tried did not appeal Peer, as they were once again not original material. Rodgers then attempted a number he had been working on using yodelling, which Peer set on calling "Blue Yodel". 

As "The Soldier's Sweetheart" / "Sleep, Baby, Sleep" started to sell well, Victor decided to advance the release of "Blue Yodel".  In Washington D.C., Rodgers worked a stint for the station WTTF with the backing of the "Jimmie Rodgers' Southeners" while he continued to make records for the label. He used the band for his recordings of  "In the Jailhouse Now" and "The Brakeman's Blues", among others. As 1928 progressed, "Blue Yodel" became a major success. The song marked the first of a series of blue yodels, The unknown origin of Rodgers' yodel has been attributed to several sources: The traditional alpine songs, its use by gandy dancers or in vaudeville and minstrel shows.  The theme of the yodels presented a main character that often exaggerated his qualities as a lover, faced the threat of other men taking his woman, and then used violence against them when they did. The yodeler also boasted of promiscuity with the use of double entendres. With the release of further songs of the series,"Blue Yodel" was later renamed on the catalogs to "Blue Yodel No. 1 (T for Texas)". "Blue Yodel No. 1" became the singer's most successful recording with over a million copies sold during his lifetime. Soon, Rodgers' show billed him as "America's Blue Yodeler".  

Following the release of "If Brother Jack Were Here", Victor was threatened with a lawsuit by Joseph W. Stern & Co. for copyright infringement on their original composition "Mother Was a Lady". As a result, the label renamed the record to its real title, and Peer began to carefully assess the material brought by Rodgers. The singer often arrived to the recording sessions short of material and he resorted to pass up old vaudeville and minstrel show songs as his own. After Peer rejected several songs, Rodgers contacted his sister-in-law, Elsie McWilliams, to help him with the composition of new material. Few of the material credited to Rodgers was authored by himself: McWilliams would go to write most of his Blue Yodels, while he additionally would hire amateur composers to write other songs. With McWilliams' help, he would also write compositions of his own which she remarked Rodgers would not stop to work on until they "sounded just right". With the sales of his records still improving after the release of "In the Jailhouse Now", Rodgers embarked on a tour of the United States: he appeared on the Southern Time circuit of Loews Theaters and the East Coast circuit of Publix Theaters. The pairing of "Blue Yodel No. 4 (California Blues)" / "Waiting for a Train" became popular due to the success of the flipside. The recording would eventually become Rodgers' second best seller of his career with a total of 365,000 copies sold during his lifetime. 

In February 1929, his health worsened. Against his doctor's constant recommendation to rest, Rodgers proceeded with his tour. During a stop in Meridian, he suffered a fever.  Rodgers intended to perform the show, but he collapsed on the dressing room shortly before the start. An x-ray ordered by his doctor, an uncommon procedure at the time, determined that the singer suffered a pulmonary tuberculosis that affected his lungs: Cavities were found on the top of both, while the bottom of his right lung showed pleurisy. As they travelled through Texas performing, Jimmie and Carrie Rodgers stopped in Kerville. The town offered the dry air and mild weather that the medical authorities of the time considered was needed for the treatment of tuberculosis. Kerrville featured multiple sanatoriums and a Veterans Hospital specialized in pulmonary disease. As Rodgers was badly affected by the weather in Washington, D.C., Meridian, and Asheville, he decided to settle in Kerville. The construction of his new home began in April 1929. With a total cost of $20,000, he named it "Blue Yodeler's Paradise". With his move to Texas, Rodgers' on-stage attire changed. He had been previously wearing brakeman's working clothes that were replaced by regular clothes and the use of a cowboy hat. By June 14, 1929, he performed during the inauguration of San Antonio's Majestic Theatre. 

At the height of this career, in 1929, Rodgers made $75,000 in royalties. After the Wall Street Crash that year, while his records continued to sell, his royalties dropped to $60,000. "Waiting for a Train" continued to be popular as the themes depicted in the song became commonplace in the lives of unemployed Americans during the Great Depression. Through a number of field recording sessions as his schedule and tour allowed it, Rodgers increased his catalogue. By November 1929, he filmed the short The Singing Brakeman at the Victor Talking Machine Studios in Camden. Continuing his tour, in late February 1930, Rodgers collapsed again during a stop in Carthage, Mississippi. Following his doctor's advice, he had to cancel his third appearance at the local movie house after he suffered of a hemorrhage the same morning. Despite his condition, Rodgers then joined a four-month tour with daily appearances on Swain's Hollywood Follies. The musical troup performed a total of 70 shows. With few of his recordings left to be released, Rodgers then head to Los Angeles to produce new material between June-July 1930. The sessions produced among other numbers "Blue Yodel no. 8, Mule Skinner Blues" and "Blue Yodel No. 9 (Standin' on the Corner)" featuring Louis Armstrong. Rodgers comissioned at the time Ray Hall, a prisoner at the Texas State Penitentiary, to help him write the song "T.B. Blues" after McWilliams refused to help. Rodgers recorded and released the compostion in 1931. 

In the summer of 1931 Rodgers recorded two sides with the Carter Family. That year, his health quickly deteriorated while his sales fell to 30,000 copies sold on an average for his records as the Great Depression progressed. Meanwhile, his excessive expenditures forced him to sell his Kerrville home. "Rodgers' Puzzle Record", a compilation containing three recordings of the singer in one side was released in England, India and Australia in 1931. The same year, the singer accepted an offer to make appearances when available at San Antonio's radio station KMAC's Tuesday show. When he was out on tour, The Jimmie Rodgers Show played his Victor recordings. In April 1932, he renegotiated his contract with the label: Rodgers was to receive $25,000  for 24 sides to be released monthly with the singer receiving $250 in advance payment per side.

Declining health and death
Rodgers had to reduce his appearances on tour schedules from five days to one per venue due to his poor health while he camped on a tent that allowed a better circulation of air. A number of concerts were cut short because of his condition, while others were cancelled. Up until 1932, Peer took trips for field sessions to record Rodgers in Atlanta, New Orleans or Dallas. After Victor removed the possibility of field sessions, Rodgers travelled to Camden, New Jersey to record at the headquarters of the company. Rodgers managed to produce ten sides while often resting between takes. Realizing the state of health of the singer, Peer arranged a follow-up session to create a backlog for the Rodgers catalog. He returned then to San Antonio where he spent most of his time in bed until he resumed his appearances on the local radio station by October of that year. In the winter, he made appearances through East Texas until he collapsed during a show in Lufkin and he was placed on an oxygen tent. He then stopped performing at KMAC and stayed at home while he arranged a new recording session with Peer for May 1932.

Rodgers and his personal nurse, Cora Bedell, arrived on May 14, 1932 in New York City on board of the SS Mohawk. Peer left the singer to rest at his usual lodging, the Taft Hotel (earlier The Manger), for a few days before the session. Meanwhile, he assigned Rodgers a driver known as Castro. The recording session in charge of Fred Maisch begun on May 17, at Victor's New York studios at 153 E 24th Street. During the first two days, Rodgers recorded six numbers while the state of his health often paused the session: the singer sat on an easy chair and he was helped by pillows to reach the microphone. A new session was scheduled for May 24, 1933. Rodgers produced four songs while he needed to lie on a cot between takes. At the end of the day, he was helped into a cab and he returned to the hotel.  The next day, he recovered and then visited Coney Island with his driver. When returning, Rodgers decided to walk the last few blocks to the hotel until he needed help to return to his room. He then suffered of an intense cough that stopped. At midnight, he resumed coughing, and he began to hemorrhage. The hotel's doctor could not be found and Castro, who was out on an errand, returned too late to take him to a hospital. Rodgers fell in a coma, and he died soon after. His pearl-gray casket was placed on a raised platform covered in lilies in a baggage car and taken back to Meridian by the Southern Railway on a trip operated by former workmates of Rodgers. On May 29, 1933, his body lay in state at the local Scottish Rite Cathedral. That afternoon, escorted by members of the Scottish Rite, the Hamasa Shrine Temple, and Knights of Pythias his body was buried at Oak Grove Cemetery. During his lifetime, Rodgers reinvigorated the deflated sales record market for the Victor Talking Machine Company, and despite the drop of sales during the depression, his records continued to sell well. At the time of his death, his sales represented 10% of the total for the label.

Style and image
Rodgers never pointed to any specific reason as to why he decided to learn to play the guitar. He recalled his earliest memories of playing upon returning from picking cotton. Although he performed with the instrument for many years, he only knew a few chords that he complemented with a flatpicking technique. As he worked on the railroads through the late 1910s and the 1920s, he developed his style of music and singing. His material was based on classic anglo-celtic storytelling and ballad singing, while black blues heavily influenced him. Ethnomusicologist Norm Cohen defined five categories for the 112 recordings that comprehended Rodgers' catalog: "19th century sentimental ballads", vaudevillian novelty songs, blues songs, traditional folk songs and "contemporary hillbilly songs". Rodgers' releases included collaborations with artists ranging from jazz to Hawaiian music. 

Instead of the 3/4 time present in traditional alpine folk music, Rodgers' yodel featured a 4/4 time. Rodgers developed his yodel through his early music career either influenced by several vaudevillian performers or directly by the recordings and live performances of Emmet Miller. From the gandy dancers Rodgers learned to elongate or shorten words to fit the metric of the song, while he carried most of the time a banjo and eventually a guitar as he worked himself on the railroads. His live performances and recordings included the use of spoken remarks between verses to encourage his musicians, or exclamations when he played alone. Additional to his yodel, Rodgers developed a train whistle noise he made with the back of his throat that consisted of the mixture of a yodel with a whistle. 

During his early appearances, Rodgers donned a bowler hat with a suit and a tie as most vaudevillian performers. As he was later also billed as "The Singing Brakeman", Rodgers added to his frequent stage wardrobe railroad worker attire. After he moved to Texas, he started to also wear cowboy hats and western clothes as the singing cowboys became popular on western films at the time. Ultimately, Rodgers would decide which clothes he used for a performance according to the audience he was expecting.

Personal life

Rodgers married Stella Kelly on May 1, 1917. The couple were both 19 years old at the time of the ceremony. The marriage split soon after due to what Kelly later described as Rodgers' tendency to procrastinate, drink, and his lack of ambition.  She considered that Rodgers spent too much money, and that by playing music he "fool away his time and money".  After two years of living separated, their divorce became final in November 1919. Rodgers then married Carrie Williamson on April 7, 1920. The marriage's first daughter, Anita, was born  in January 1921. June, their second child, was born in 1923, but she died in December of that year. To return in time for her funeral and Christmas, Rodgers had to pawn his banjo. 

Both of his wives complained of Rodgers' excessive expenditures, and later his lavish lifestyle. With his adult life marked by his suffering of tuberculosis, Rodgers resorted to drinking to ease the pain produced by the disease.  On June 9 , 1932, Rodgers lost a paternity lawsuit to his former wife Stella for the birth of Kathryn Rodgers in February 1918. Without conclusive evidence of Rodgers being close to Kelly at the time of the child's conception, judge Edgar Vaught considered that she was born with the couple under legal wedlock. Rodgers was then ordered to pay $50 in child support monthly until Kathryn reached 18 years of age. After Rodgers' death, the monthly support from his estate stopped as she married. Kathryn Rodgers died soon later, in 1938. 

Rodgers was a Freemason: he was inducted to the order in Meridian on August 9, 1920. In 1930, he joined the Elks lodge. In 1931, he reached the rank of Master Mason in Meridian. That year, he was moved to the San Antonio Scottish Rite Cathedral and he received the local degree, while he was also associated with the Alzafar Temple. Additionally in 1931, Rodgers was invited to Austin, Texas and named a honorary Texas Ranger. To commemorate the occasion, the singer would later release the song "The Yodeling Ranger".

Legacy

Influence
Rodgers is considered the Father of Country Music. The Country Music Hall of Fame inducted Rodgers among the inaugural class of 1961. To the Hall of Fame Rodgers "brought to the emerging genre of 'hillbilly music' a distinctive, colorful personality and a rousing vocal style" that "created and defined the role of the singing star in country music". The Rock and Roll Hall of Fame inducted Rodgers as an early influence with the class of 1986. Rodgers was inducted by Jerry Wexler, as the Hall of Fame determined that the genre "owes an immeasurable debt" to the singer,  and that despite being a country music singer they considered that "his fusion of blues, Appalachian ballads and spirituals was an early framework for rock and roll" that influenced "everyone from Bob Dylan to Lynyrd Skynyrd." The Blues Hall of Fame wrote about Rodgers induction: "His reworkings of the blues not only helped popularize the music with white audiences but were also performed by many singers from the African American community that produced the blues that inspired Rodgers in the first place." Rodgers was the first artist inducted to the Songwriters Hall of Fame in 1970 for his influence in artists of "every genre" with his music that "Fused hillbilly, gospel, blues, jazz, pop and mountain folk music into timeless American standards." Also in 1970, he was inducted to the Nashville Songwriters Hall of Fame. The entry on Rodgers remarked his influence in mutiple generations of musicians and it remarked it as "undying". Additionally, he was inducted into the Alabama Music Hall of Fame and the Bue Ridge Music Hall of Fame in 1993 and 2018 respectively.

For Encyclopædia Britannica Rodgers legacy made him "one of the principal figures in the emergence of the country and western style of popular music". Rolling Stone magazine placed Rodgers at number 11 on the 100 Greatest Country Artists of All Time list, and at number 88 on their 200 Greatest Singers of all time list. Allmusic remarked Rodgers' status as "the first nationally known star of country music" and his influence in later musicians while declaring that the singer "affected the history of country music by making it a viable, commercially popular medium". 

Country singers Gene Autry and Jimmie Davis were heavily influenced by Rodgers. Both of them recorded multiple songs of his repertoire, also yodeling, until they changed their styles to avoid being deemed imitators. As a teenager, Hank Snow heard Rodgers' "Blue Moon and Skies" on the radio. Snow started to imitate Rodgers' guitar playing and singing style, while he would later credit him as his one major influence. Ernest Tubb also considered Rodgers his greatest influence. Early in his career Tubb kept a picture of Rodgers that at one point became worn out. He then decided to call Rodgers' widow to obtain a new copy. Carrie Rodgers invited him and his family to her home. Eventually, she decided to help Tubb with his career: they recorded a duet of the tribute song "We Miss Him When the Evening Shadows Fall", and Carrie presented Tubb with Rodgers' guitar as a gift. Robert Johnson's step-sister, Annye, remembered Rodgers as their favorite country singer. Johnson played "Waiting for a Train", and imitated Rodgers' yodel. Other artists that were heavily influenced by Rodgers include Lefty Frizzell, Roy Rogers, Eddy Arnold, Jerry Lee Lewis, Johnny Cash, Willie Nelson, Merle Haggard, Bob Dylan, George Harrison, Lynyrd Skynyrd, John Fahey, and Alison Krauss. Rodgers' appearance on The Singing Brakeman is considered one of the first music videos.

In South Africa Rodgers' records were distributed by Regal Zonophone Records. Writer Es'kia Mphahlele wrote on his autobiography, Down Second Avenue, his memories of young men bringing gramophones and Rodgers' records from Pretoria and how his music could be heard on Christmas day throughout his village. Rodgers' records particularly sold well in Durban, a city mostly populated by the Zulu. In 1930, singers Griffiths Motsieloa and Ignatius Monare recorded their version of a blue yodel in Zulu language entitled "Aubuti Nkikho" in London. In 1932, William Mseleku recorded "Eku Hambeni" and "Sifikile Tina". The songs were inspired by Rodgers' style and recorded in Zulu. Rodgers influenced several Zimbabwean acoustic guitarists of the 1940s including Chinemberi, Mattaka, Jacob Mhungu and Jeremiah Kainga. Rodgers' recordings reached the country imported from South Africa. The local artists developed a two-finger playing style that used the thumb and first finger to emulate the sound of the singer, while they also frequently used yodels. Recordings of Rodgers were taken to the Great Rift Valley of Kenya by English missionaries that lived among the Kipsigis people. The tribe sang about Rodgers on a traditional song recorded in 1950 by ethnomusicologist Hugh Tracey who later named it "Chemirocha III".

Tributes
In January 1935, the Grand Ole Opry artists the Delmore Brothers and Uncle Dave Macon stopped on their way to New Orleans to visit Rodgers' brother Tal and his wife in Meridian to play for them their tribute song "Blue Railroad Train". Also in 1935, Rodgers' widow published a biographical book: My Husband, Jimmie Rodgers.  On May 16, 1953, the first Jimmie Rodgers Memorial Festival took place in Meridian. The festival featured appearances by country music singers and other entertainers that were influenced by Rodgers, as well as his family members. The festival was celebrated in an intermitent fashion until it became a recurring event starting in 1972. During the first edition attendees included Carrie Rodgers, Elsie McWilliams, Ralph Peer, Hugh L. White, Frank G. Clement, railroad representatives and Mary Jones (the wife of engineer Casey Jones) and Lillie Williams (Hank Williams' mother). Several performers that were influenced by Rodgers were present, among them 25 Grand Ole Opry artists led in the initiative by Ernest Tubb and Hank Snow. The show attracted a crowd of 30,000 and during the day a granite monument to Rodgers was unveiled, as well as a static locomotive as a memorial to the deceased railroad workers of Meridian. 

On May 24, 1978, the United States Postal Service issued a 13-cent commemorative stamp honoring Rodgers, the first in its long-running Performing Arts Series. The stamp was designed by Jim Sharpe, and depicted Rodgers with brakeman's outfit and guitar, standing in front of a locomotive giving his famous "two thumbs up" gesture. The 1982 film Honkytonk Man, directed by and starring Clint Eastwood, was loosely based on Rodgers' life. In 1997 Bob Dylan put together a tribute compilation of major artists covering Rodgers' songs, The Songs of Jimmie Rodgers, A Tribute. The artists included Bono, Alison Krauss & Union Station, Jerry Garcia, Dickey Betts, Dwight Yoakam, Aaron Neville, John Mellencamp, Willie Nelson and others.  In 2004, Steve Forbert's tribute album Any Old Time was nominated for a Grammy Award for Best Traditional Folk Album. In 2007, Rodgers was honored with a marker on the Mississippi Blues Trail in his hometown of Meridian, the first outside of the Mississippi Delta. In May 2010 a marker on the Mississippi Country Music Trail was erected near Rodgers' gravesite. The Elton John and Leon Russell 2010 collaboration The Union featured the tribute "Jimmie Rodgers' Dream". In 2013, a North Carolina historical marker was dedicated on Haywood Street in Asheville.

See also
Jimmie Rodgers discography

Footnotes

References

External links

 
 
 
 Jimmie Rodgers recordings at the Discography of American Historical Recordings.

1897 births
1933 deaths
American country singer-songwriters
20th-century deaths from tuberculosis
Country Music Hall of Fame inductees
Country musicians from Mississippi
Musicians from Meridian, Mississippi
People from Sumter County, Alabama
Grammy Lifetime Achievement Award winners
Yodelers
Mississippi Blues Trail
RCA Victor artists
Bluebird Records artists
American country guitarists
American acoustic guitarists
American male guitarists
American Freemasons
Members of the Benevolent and Protective Order of Elks
Tuberculosis deaths in New York (state)
Burials in Mississippi
20th-century American singers
20th-century American guitarists
Singer-songwriters from Mississippi
Guitarists from Alabama
Guitarists from Mississippi
Country musicians from Alabama
20th-century American male musicians
People from Kerrville, Texas
American male singer-songwriters
Singer-songwriters from Alabama
Singer-songwriters from Texas